Mersing (Terengganu Malay: Merecing or Ngesing) is a town, mukim and the capital of Mersing District, Johor, Malaysia.

As of 2010, the town has an estimated population of 70,894.

Mersing town, is particularly significant for a number of reasons: it is one of only two major towns situated in the eastern half of Johor state (the other being Kota Tinggi), it lies on the main trunk road that connects southern as well as eastern Johor with the east coast of Pahang state including Pahang's capital Kuantan (part of Federal Route, and it is the main departure point for ferries to the nearby offshore islands such as Pulau Rawa of Sultan Iskandar Marine Park (Malay: Taman Laut Sultan Iskandar) and also Tioman Island, Pahang.

Government and politics
Mersing District Council is the local authority of the whole Mersing District including Mersing town. It was formed on 26 May 1977 through the merger of the Mersing Town Council and the local councils of Jemaluang, Kampung Hubong, Kampung Pengkalan Batu, Kampung Sri Pantai and Mersing Kecil.

Climate

Culture

The Malays of Mersing are unique compared to the rest of Johor is that many of them are of Terengganu ancestry, this are proven by the Keropok Lekor industries which is popular in the town and many still speak Terengganu Malay along with the Johor dialect of Malay.

The Chinese community in Mersing mainly belongs to the Cantonese dialect group and speak Cantonese, however, many locals, especially business owners have no issue conversing in Mandarin.

Transportation

Car
Being located along Federal Route 3, Mersing is relatively accessible for a town its size. Northward this highway goes to Kuantan, Kuala Terengganu and Kota Bharu before terminating at Rantau Panjang at the border with Thailand. Southwards highway 3 goes to Jemaluang and Kota Tinggi and terminates at Johor Bahru, the state capital. Jalan Felda Nitar connects Felda Nitar, Kluang, Ayer Hitam and Batu Pahat, also connects to North–South Expressway Southern Route via Ayer Hitam Interchange to Kuala Lumpur.

Water
Mersing port in the mouth of Mersing River is also the main port for ferries to Tioman Island and the more than 40 other islands in the Seribuat Archipelago.

References

External links

Mersing In facebook

Towns in Johor
Mersing District
Mukims of Johor